Şevval is a given name. Notable people with the name include:

Şevval Alpavut (born 1998), Turkish footballer
Şevval Sam (born 1973), Turkish singer and actress
Yonca Şevval Erdem (born 1996), Turkish water polo player

Turkish feminine given names